Rosamond Marie Coghlan (March 18, 1851 – April 2, 1932) was an English actress.

Coghlan was born in Peterborough, England, to author Francis Coghlan, and Anna Marie, née Kirby. Her elder brother (or half-brother) was the actor Charles Francis Coghlan. Her niece was Gertrude Coghlan. Rose went to America in 1871 as part of Lydia Thompson's troupe touring the U.S.. She made her Broadway debut in 1872 in a musical. Coghlan was again in England from 1873 to 1877, playing with Barry Sullivan, and then returned to America. She became prominent as Countess Zicka in Diplomacy, and Stephanie in Forget-me-not. She was at Wallack's almost continuously until 1888, and subsequently appeared in melodrama in parts like the title-role of The Sporting Duchess.  

Following the 1899 death of her brother, Charles Coghlan, in 1901 Rose appeared at Denver, Colorado's, Elitch Theatre in the world premiere of her brother's play, Fortune's Bridge. Rose stated that "my particular reason for coming to Denver was to produce my brother's play -- the one he finished just before his death. It's called Fortune's Bridge, but he didn't give it the name."  Rose explained that the manuscript was sent to a typist and at the end her brother signed it and added his Canadian address: "Charles Coghlan, Fortune Bridge." Apparently the typist moved it to the head of the first page and typed, "Fortune's Bridge, by Charles Coghlan."  Rose stated "the name seemed to fit the play so well I allowed it to stand."  

Coghlan died in 1932 in Harrison, New York. She had been married twice first to Clinton J. Edgerly from 1885 to 1890 and second to John T. Sullivan from 1890 to 1893.  She had two children, an adopted daughter and a son.

Filmography
As You Like It (1912)
The Eavesdropper (1912) (*short)
The Sporting Duchess (1915)
Thou Shalt Not Kill (1915)
The Faded Flower (1916)
Her Surrender (1916)
Beyond the Rainbow (1922)
 The Secrets of Paris (1922)
Under the Red Robe (1923)

References

Links
New York Times "ROSE COGHLAN IS BANKRUPT; For Second Time Actress Seeks to be Relieved of Her Debts."  February 5, 1915  (*a mention of her son is in this article)
Internet Archive transcripts of book "Familiar Chats With the Queens of the Stage" by Alan Dale, c. 1890.

External links

Rose Coghlan photo gallery at the NYP Library
Rose Coghlan reciting "Charge of the Light Brigade" 1909, only known recording of Rose Coghlan

English stage actresses
19th-century English actresses
1851 births
1932 deaths
British expatriate actresses in the United States